The following is a list of archaeological sites of the Norte Chico civilization (also Caral civilization). The Norte Chico comprises four coastal river valleys.

References 

 List Norte
History of Peru
Andean preceramic
Norte Chico civilization